AGAS - Antiglobalization Activists in Syria - is a Syrian-based collective of opponents to the neoliberal globalization. In Arabic the group uses the name al-Badil (البديل) which means the alternative.

AGAS was set up on January 1, 2003. Several of its leaders have spent years behind bars as prisoners of conscience.

By focusing not only political rights, but also on social and economic rights, AGAS distinguishes itself from a large part of the Syrian opposition.

Insisting on its independence, AGAS cooperates internationally with the Committee for the Abolition of the Third World Debt and ATTAC. AGAS also participates in the World Social Forum. By labeling itself "Anti-globalization", rather than "Alter-globalization" AGAS distinguishes itself from ATTAC and other important parts of the movement.

External links
AGAS website 

Politics of Syria
Anti-globalization organizations
Anti-corporate activism
Organizations established in 2003
2003 establishments in Syria
Syrian opposition